Rotmistrivka is an impact crater in Ukraine (Cherkasy Oblast).

Located near the village Rotmistrivka of Smila district.

The crater is 2.7 km in diameter, with an age estimated at 120 ± 10 million years (Lower Cretaceous). It is not exposed to the surface, being buried beneath continental and marine sedimentary deposits.  The crater contains a brecciated lens of granite fragments and particles of impact glass, overlain by shales, limestones and granite-derived sandstones of lower Cretaceous age.

References 

Impact craters of Ukraine
Cretaceous impact craters
Geography of Cherkasy Oblast